Borsonia zelandica is an extinct species of sea snail, a marine gastropod mollusk in the family Borsoniidae.

Description
The spiral ornament consists of four wavy cords between the keel and the lower suture. The suture is margined by a stout swelling. There are 6 to 7 axials per whorl with wider interstices.

Distribution
This extinct marine species was endemic to New Zealand

References

 Maxwell, P.A. (2009). Cenozoic Mollusca. pp 232–254 in Gordon, D.P. (ed.) New Zealand inventory of biodiversity. Volume one. Kingdom Animalia: Radiata, Lophotrochozoa, Deuterostomia. Canterbury University Press, Christchurch.

zelandica
Gastropods described in 1919